Aegoceras (Beaniceras) is small, coarsely ribbed subgenus ammonite from the Lower Jurassic with coarsely ribbed rounded whorls. The shell is evolute, early whorls a barrel-shaped cadicone, later become serpenticonic.

Distribution
Jurassic of France, Germany and Spain

References
Notes

Bibliography
 Treatise on Invertebrate Paleontology, Part L; Ch. Mesozoic Ammonoidea.. Geological Soc. of America and Uni. Kansas Press, R.C Moore (ed)

Early Jurassic ammonites of Europe
Liparoceratidae
Animal subgenera